The Men's 110 meters hurdles at the 2011 All-Africa Games took place on 12 September at the Estádio Nacional do Zimpeto.

Medalists

Records
Prior to the competition, the following records were as follows.

Schedule

Results

Final
Wind : +2.0 m/s

References

External links

110 meters hurdles